, was an admiral in the Imperial Japanese Navy during World War II.

Biography
Gotō was a native of Takanashi Village in Senboku District, Akita (what is now the city of Daisen, Akita), and a graduate of the 37th class of the Imperial Japanese Naval Academy in 1909. As a lieutenant during World War I, he served on the battleship  and cruiser , before receiving his first command, the destroyer  on 26 April 1919. He subsequently commanded the destroyers  and (as lieutenant commander) .

He was promoted to commander on 1 December 1926.

From December 1929, Gotō was assigned to command minesweeper flotillas and destroyer squadrons and was promoted to captain in December 1931.
Gotō was promoted to rear admiral on 1 December 1937. During the Second Sino-Japanese War he commanded the 5th Torpedo Squadron, followed by the 2nd Torpedo Squadron. He was promoted to vice admiral on 15 October 1941.

World War II
By the outset of the war, Gotō commanded the 24th Air Flotilla. He took part in the battle for Wake Island, his bombers destroying several American aircraft on the ground on the first day of combat. But soon, his planes began to encounter fierce resistance and were only relieved by the arrival of Rear-Admiral Tamon Yamaguchi's relief force.

On February 1, 1942, while Gotō was in command of aircraft bases in the Marshall Islands and Gilbert Islands, the Allies launched the Marshalls–Gilberts raids in which Japanese positions in Micronesia were attacked by United States Navy aircraft primarily in an effort to boost American public morale. Although fewer than 18 Japanese aircraft were shot down or destroyed by bombs, Gotō came under criticism for his failure to shoot down the bombers. He was also the primary Japanese commander during the action off Bougainville on 20 February 1942 which resulted in the loss of 23 Japanese aircraft against only 2 Americans. Gotō was relieved of his combat command, and reassigned as commander of the Chinkai Guard District on 15 September 1942.

On 15 September 1944, Gotō was in command of the 12th Air Fleet, and concurrently was placed in command of the Ōminato Guard District from 15 February 1945; however, from 15 March, he was placed on the inactive list awaiting reassignment and resigned from active service on 21 May 1945.

Gotō died in 1967.

Notes

References

 The Pacific War Online Encyclopedia

Further reading

The Marshall Islands by Gordon L. Rottman (2004) 

1887 births
1967 deaths
People from Daisen, Akita
Japanese military personnel of World War I
Japanese admirals of World War II
Imperial Japanese Navy admirals
Military personnel from Akita Prefecture